Irvine Blacksmith Shop, at 14952 Sand Canyon Ave. in Irvine, California, was built in 1915-16 by the Irvine Company.  It was listed on the National Register of Historic Places in 1986.

It has a utilitarian style generally and a Western false front, with a wide step-down parapet.

The blacksmith shop was converted to a restaurant, Knowlwood Restaurant, in 1989.

References

National Register of Historic Places in Orange County, California
Buildings and structures completed in 1915
Blacksmith shops